Md. Fazle Rabbi Miah (16 April 1946 – 22 July 2022) was a Bangladesh Awami League politician, who served as the  deputy speaker of the Jatiya Sangsad and also a member representing the Gaibandha-5 constituency for 7 terms. He was a member of the Awami League Central Committee. Before joining Awami League, he won 4 times as Member of Parliament from Jatiya Party (Ershad).

Early life 
Miah was born on 16 April 1946 in Gaibandha District.

Career 
From 1978 to 1979, Miah was Secretary of the District Bar Association, Gaibandha.

From 1980 to 1981, Miah was the chairperson of the Gaibandha District unit of Bangladesh Association for Voluntary Sterilization.

Death 
Miah died 23 July 2022 in The Mount Sinai Hospital in New York City.

References

1946 births
2022 deaths
People from Gaibandha District
20th-century Bangladeshi lawyers
Awami League politicians
Deputy Speakers of the Jatiya Sangsad
3rd Jatiya Sangsad members
4th Jatiya Sangsad members
5th Jatiya Sangsad members
7th Jatiya Sangsad members
9th Jatiya Sangsad members
10th Jatiya Sangsad members
11th Jatiya Sangsad members
People of the Bangladesh Liberation War